Alfred Massé (2 June 1870 – 28 December 1951) was a French lawyer, journalist and politician who was twice Minister of Commerce and Industry shortly before World War I (1914–18).

Early years

Alfred Louis François Pierre Massé was born on 2 June 1870 in Pougues-les-Eaux, Nièvre.
He was the son of a former mayor of Nevers and former general councilor.
His grandfather, also Alfred Massé, was a Senator for Nièvre. 
Massé became a lawyer and publicist.
He edited La Tribune and contributed to Le Siècle, La Lanterne,  and Le Rappel.
He participated in conferences of the Union of Republican Youth, and in pro-democracy demonstrations in the Latin Quarter.

Deputy and minister

On 22 May 1898 Massé was elected deputy for the first district of Nevers in the first round of voting, and sat with the Radical Socialist group.
He was reelected on 11 May 1902, 6 May 1906 and 8 May 1910.
He was rapporteur for the Finance Committee, and participated in all budget discussions.
On 3 July 1905 he voted in favor of the complete bill for separation of church and state.

Massé was Minister of Commerce and Industry from 2 March 1911 to 27 June 1911 in the cabinet of Ernest Monis.
He was elected vice-president of the Chamber of Deputies on 14 November 1911, and reelected on 9 January 1912.
He resigned on 14 May 1913 after being appointed Minister of Commerce, Industry, Posts and Telegraphs from 22 March 1913 to 9 December 1913 in the cabinet of Louis Barthou.
He lost his seat in the Chamber on 26 April 1914.

Later career

During World War I Massé was involved in managing civilian supplies.
In 1915 he wrote Le Troupeau français et la guerre (The French herd and the war) in which he argued in favor of industrial slaughterhouses in production centers.
Massé was elected Senator on 11 January 1920, and sat on committees on Customs, Education and Agriculture.
He failed to be reelected in January 1924.
Alfred Massé died on 28 December 1951 in Pougues-les-Eaux.

Publications

Notes

Sources

1870 births
1951 deaths
People from Nièvre
Politicians from Bourgogne-Franche-Comté
Radical Party (France) politicians
French Ministers of Commerce and Industry
French Ministers of Commerce, Industry, Posts, and Telegraphs
Members of the 7th Chamber of Deputies of the French Third Republic
Members of the 8th Chamber of Deputies of the French Third Republic
Members of the 9th Chamber of Deputies of the French Third Republic
Members of the 10th Chamber of Deputies of the French Third Republic
French Senators of the Third Republic
Senators of Nièvre